Alex Rădulescu (born 7 December 1974) is a former tennis player from Romania, who competed for Germany.

Rădulescu turned professional in 1995. The righthander reached his highest individual ranking on the ATP Tour on 10 March 1997, when he became World No. 51. At the 1996 Wimbledon tournament Rădulescu had his best finish at a Grand Slam tournament, where he reached the quarterfinals by defeating Arnaud Boetsch, Stefano Pescosolido, David Wheaton and Neville Godwin before losing to MaliVai Washington. He currently coaches at the Tennis-Company in Munich.

Junior Grand Slam finals

Doubles: 1 (1 runner-up)

ATP career finals

Singles: 1 (1 runner-up)

ATP Challenger and ITF Futures Finals

Singles: 6 (4–2)

Doubles: 2 (2–0)

Performance timeline

Singles

External links
 
 

1974 births
Living people
German male tennis players
German tennis coaches
Romanian expatriate sportspeople in Germany
Tennis players from Bucharest